St Joseph's Boys' High School is a secondary school in Newry, Northern Ireland. It was founded in 1958 and is a Roman Catholic maintained school within the Southern Education and Library Board area. The school is on the A28 Armagh Road, on the County Armagh side of the Newry River.

External links
 School website

Education in Newry
Catholic secondary schools in Northern Ireland
Secondary schools in County Armagh
Boys' schools in Northern Ireland